Smaragdina militaris is a species of case-bearing leaf beetle in the family Chrysomelidae. It is found in North America.

Subspecies
These two subspecies belong to the species Smaragdina militaris:
 Smaragdina militaris arizonica (Schaeffer, 1920) i c g
 Smaragdina militaris militaris (J. L. LeConte, 1858) i c g
Data sources: i = ITIS, c = Catalogue of Life, g = GBIF, b = Bugguide.net

References

Further reading

 

Clytrina
Articles created by Qbugbot
Beetles described in 1858